North Kesteven Academy is a co-educational academy school on Moor Lane, off the A1434 at North Hykeham, in North Kesteven, Lincolnshire, England.

History

Grammar school
The school was founded as North Kesteven Grammar School in 1961 when administered by the County of Lincoln - Parts of Kesteven Education Committee, based in Sleaford. It moved into a new building in January 1961 with 600 mixed pupils. In October 1967, meetings with parents about comprehensive education took place.

Comprehensive
The school became a comprehensive school in 1970, at which time it contained 1200 pupils. From April 1974, it was administered by Lincolnshire. It became grant-maintained in April 1992 and a foundation school in September 1999. A sixth form complex opened in 1999, shared as the North Hykeham Joint Sixth Form.

The school was designated a specialist Arts College in performing arts in September 2000, and opened a new Arts Complex in September 2002, which included the 250-seat Terry O'Toole Theatre. The school was awarded academy status in 2010.

School site
The school is adjacent to Robert Pattinson School on the west side of Moor Lane. Adjacent, on the same site to the west, is North Kesteven Leisure Centre and the Terry O'Toole Theatre. The sports centre is used by the school as a gym during school hours.

Curriculum
The school has approximately 1400 pupils aged 11 to 18, and teaches towards GCSE, A Level and BTEC certificates in the fields of Technologies, Arts, History, Geography, Business Studies and Modern Foreign Languages.

Notable former pupils

North Kesteven Grammar School
 Nick Johnston (1961–66), MSP for Mid Scotland and Fife from 1999-2001.
 David Ward, Lib Dem MP from 2010-15 for Bradford East

North Kesteven Comprehensive School
 Kelly Adams - actress
 Jonathan Kerrigan - actor
 Steve Froggatt - Footballer
 Jennifer Pacey - Athlete and played 'Enigma' on the 2008 reboot of Gladiators

References

External links
 School website
 Terry O'Toole Theatre
 WikiMapia

Educational institutions established in 1961
North Kesteven District
Theatres in Lincolnshire
Sports venues in Lincolnshire
Secondary schools in Lincolnshire
1961 establishments in England
Academies in Lincolnshire